This is a list of association football (soccer) families. The countries are listed according to the national teams of the senior family member if the other family member played for a different country.

A

Algeria 

 Farès Bahlouli,  Mohamed Bahlouli,  Djibril Bahlouli (brother)
 Karim Benyamina,  Soufian Benyamina (brother)
 Fathi Chebal,  Jordan Faucher (nephew)
 Tahar Chérif El-Ouazzani, Abdennour Chérif El-Ouazzani (brother), Hichem Chérif El-Ouazzani (son)
 Abdelkader Ferhaoui,  Ryan Ferhaoui (son)
 Abdelkader Ghezzal, Rachid Ghezzal (brother)
 Nacer Guedioura, Adlène Guedioura (son)
 Jugurtha Hamroun, Rezki Hamroune (cousin)
 Mohamed Kaci-Saïd, Kamel Kaci-Saïd (brother)
 Ahmed Oudjani, Chérif Oudjani (son)
 Antar Yahia, Karim Ziani (brother-in-law)
 Abdelaziz Zarabi, Abderraouf Zarabi (son), Kheireddine Zarabi (son)
 Malik Zorgane, Adem Zorgane (son)

Angola 

 Bastos, Nandinho (brother)
 Diangi Matusiwa,  Azor Matusiwa (brother)
 Wilson Eduardo, João Mário (brother)
 Rudy,  Quevin Castro (brother)
 Joaquim Alberto Silva,  Xande Silva (son)
 Beto Vidigal, Lito Vidigal (brother),  José Luís Vidigal (brother),  Toni Vidigal (brother), Jorge Filipe Vidigal (brother),  André Vidigal (son)
 Toy Vilhena,  Janet Morin (vrouw),  Sabrina Vilhena(daughter),  Randy Vilhena (son),  Tonny Vilhena (brother), Gilberto da Silva (cousin of Randy, Sabrina & Tonny; nephew of Toy & Janet)

B

Benin 

 Stéphane Sessègnon,  Ryan Sessegnon (cousin),  Steven Sessegnon (cousin/twin brother of Ryan)
 Dinalo Adigo, Ryan and Noah (sons), Birel and Gloria daughters.

Botswana 

 Noah Maposa, Stephen Maposa (brother)

Burkina Faso 
 Aristide Bancé (see  Aruna Dindane)
 Paul Koulibaly, Pierre Koulibaly (twin brother)
 Kamou Malo, Patrick Malo (son)
 Feu Traoré Isaï, Alain Traoré, Bertrand Traoré (sons), Lassina Traoré (nephew)

Burundi 
 Elvis Kamsoba, Pacifique Niyongabire (brother)
 Diamant Ramazani,  Largie Ramazani (brother)

C

Cameroon 

 Paul Bahoken, Stéphane Bahoken (son)
 Cyrille Florent Bella,  Armel Bella-Kotchap (son)
 Joseph Elanga,  Anthony Elanga (son)
 Samuel Eto'o, David Eto'o, Etienne Eto'o (brothers)
 Joseph-Désiré Job, Marvin Matip, Joël Matip (distant cousins)
 Mathurin Kameni, Carlos Kameni (brother)
 André Kana-Biyik, François Omam-Biyik (brother), Francis Eliezer Omam (cousin), Jean-Armel Kana-Biyik (son)
 Bayoi Makoun,  Christian Makoun (son)
 Jean Makoun Sr., Jean Makoun (son)
 Stéphane Mbia, Franck Etoundi (brother)
 Edouard Oum Ndeki, Jean-Paul Ndeki (brother)
 Marcel Ndjeng (see  Dominique Ndjeng)
 Fabrice Ondoa, André Onana (cousin)
 Rigobert Song, Alex Song (nephew)
 Jacques Songo'o, Franck Songo'o, Yann Songo'o (sons)
 Guy Tapoko,  Kevin Tapoko (son)
 Alphonse Tchami, Bertrand Tchami, Joël Tchami, Hervé Tchami (brothers)
 Bill Tchato, Enzo Tchato (son)
 Alexis Tibidi Sr.,  Alexis Tibidi Jr. (son)
 Stéphane Zobo, Stève Mvoué (brother)

Cape Verde 
 Fábio Arcanjo, Telmo Arcanjo (brother)
 Deroy Duarte (see  Laros Duarte)
 Bruno Leite (see  António Sousa)
 Garry Rodrigues,  Jerson Cabral (cousin)
 Cláudio Tavares,  Miguel Tavares (brother), Renato Sanches (cousin)
 Nélson Veiga,  Renato Veiga (son)
 Vozinha, Delmiro (brother)

Central African Republic 

 Evans Kondogbia, Geoffrey Kondogbia (brother)
 Eloge Enza Yamissi, Manassé Enza-Yamissi (brother)
 Quentin N'Gakoutou,  Yannis N'Gakoutou (brother)
 Kelly Youga, Amos Youga (brother),  Willem Geubbels (nephew)
 Lionel Zouma,  Kurt Zouma,  Yoan Zouma (brothers)

Chad 

 Japhet N'Doram, Rodrigue N'Doram,  Kévin N'Doram (sons)
 Kévin Nicaise,  Faris Haroun, Nadjim Haroun (cousins)
 Haroun Tchaouna,  Loum Tchaouna (brother)

Comoros 

 Ibor Bakar, Djamel Bakar (brother)

D

Democratic Republic of the Congo 

 Fedor Assombalonga, Britt Assombalonga (son)
Kakoko Etepé,   Yannick Kakoko (son)
Kembo Uba Kembo,  Jirès Kembo Ekoko (son),  Kylian Mbappé (Kembo Ekoko's adoptive brother)
 Lomana LuaLua, Trésor Kandol (cousin), Yannick Bolasie (cousin), Kazenga LuaLua (brother),
Roger Lukaku,  Romelu Lukaku,  Jordan Lukaku (sons),  Boli Bolingoli-Mbombo (nephew)
 Jacques Maghoma, Christian Maghoma,  Paris Maghoma (brothers)
 René Makondele,  Guy-Guy Lema (cousin),  Kuanzambi Barssabas (cousin)
Kuyangana Makukula,  Ariza Makukula (son)
Richard Mapuata, Cédric Makiadi, Fabrice Makiadi, Matondo Makiadi (sons)
 Ricky Mavuba,  Rio Mavuba (son)
Marcel Kimemba Mbayo,  Dylan Mbayo (son)
 Mpangi Merikani, Jonathan Bolingi
 Paul-José M'Poku,  Albert Sambi Lokonga (half brother),  Fabrice Sambi Lokonga (half brother of Paul José & brother of Albert)
 Arnold Mvuemba,  Jonathan Mvuemba,  Lionel Menga Mvuemba (brothers)
 Felix Mwamba Musasa, Kabamba Musasa (brother)
 Michel Ngonge,  Cyril Ngonge (son)
 Pelly Ruddock Mpanzu,  Peter Kioso (cousin)
 Gabriel Zakuani, Steve Zakuani (brother)

E

Egypt 

 Mohamed Aboutrika, Ahmed Aboutrika (son)
 Nader El-Sayed, Ahmed Nader (son)
 Ekramy El-Shahat, Sherif Ekramy (son)
 Yehia Emam, Hamada Emam (son), Hazem Emam (grandson/Hamada's son)
 Saleh Gomaa, Abdallah Gomaa (brother)
 Hossam Hassan, Ibrahim Hassan (twin brother)
 Yasser Rayyan, Ahmed Yasser Rayyan (son)
 Saleh Selim, Tarek Selim (brother)
 Abdelaziz Tawfik, Ahmed Tawfik (brother), Akram Tawfik (brother)
 Ibrahim Youssef, Ismail Youssef (brother), Sayed Youssef (brother)

Equatorial Guinea 

 Carlos Akapo, Javier Akapo (brother)
 Norberto Balboa, Armando Balboa, Chiqui Balboa (brothers),  Domènec Balmanya (brother-in-law's Armando), Javier Balboa (grandson), Álex Balboa (Javier's cousin)
 Benjamín, Iván Zarandona (brother)
 Vicente Engonga Nguema,  Vicente Engonga,  Julio Engonga,  Rafa Engonga,  Óscar Engonga (sons), Igor (grandson/son of Óscar),  Joshua Engonga (grandson/son of Julio)
 Juvenal, Alberto, José Manuel Edjogo-Owono (brothers)
 André Neles,  Atila Neles (brother)
 Ruslan Obiang, Pedro Obiang (cousin)
 Sena, Kike Boula (cousin)
 Salomón Obama, Fede (twin brother)

G

Gabon 

 Pierre Aubameyang, Catilina Aubameyang (son), Willy Aubameyang (son), Pierre-Emerick Aubameyang (son)

Gambia 

 Biri Biri, Yusupha Njie (son)
 Alieu Jagne, Saihou Jagne (brother)
 Saidy Janko,  Lenny Janko (brother)
 Cherno Samba, Mustapha Carayol (cousin)
 Bubacarr Sanneh, Muhammed Sanneh (brother)
 Alagie Sosseh, Sal Jobarteh (brother)

Ghana 

 Eric Addo, Ransford Addo (brother)
 Opoku Agyemang, Opoku Antwi (brother)
 Charles Akonnor,  Jesaja Herrmann (son)
 Shilla Alhassan, Illiasu Shilla (brother)
 Joetex Asamoah Frimpong, Eric Asamoah-Frimpong, Daniel Asamoah Frimpong (brothers)
 Owusu Benson,  Tyron Owusu (son)
 Caleb Ekuban, Joseph Ekuban (brother)
 Baffour Gyan, Asamoah Gyan (brother)
 Edwin Gyasi, Raymond Gyasi (brother)
 Nana Gyau,  Philip Gyau (son),  Joe Gyau (grandson/son of Philip)
 Bradley Hudson-Odoi,  Callum Hudson-Odoi (brother)
 Richard Kingson, Laryea Kingston (brother)
 Samuel Kuffour,  Matai Akinmboni (nephew)
 Nii Lamptey, Nathaniel Lamptey (brother)
 Sulley Muntari, Sulley Muniru (brother)
 Lloyd Owusu, Derek Asamoah (cousin)
 Jacob Partey, Thomas Partey (son), Francis Narh (son/half-brother of Thomas)
 Abedi Pele, Kwame Ayew, Sola Ayew (brothers), André Ayew, Jordan Ayew (sons), Ibrahim Ayew (son/half-brother of André & Jordan)
 Prince Polley, Robin Polley (son)
 Robert Saba, Christian Saba (brother)
 Edward Sarpei, Hans Sarpei (brother)
 Charles Takyi, Stephen Boachie (cousin)
 Isaac Vorsah, Sampson Cudjoe (cousin)
 Mubarak Wakaso, Alhassan Wakaso (brother)
 Iñaki Williams,  Nico Williams (brother)
 Ishmael Yartey, Ishaque Yartey (brother)
 Tony Yeboah,  Kelvin Yeboah (nephew)

Guinea 

 Bobo Baldé, Yasser Baldé (half-brother)
 Fousseni Bamba,  Yacouba Bamba (brother)
 Pascal Feindouno, Simon Feindouno, Benjamin Feindouno (brothers), Abdoul Karim Sylla (brother-in-law)
 Souleymane Oularé,  Obbi Oularé (son)
 Florentin Pogba, Mathias Pogba (twin brother),  Paul Pogba (brother)

Guinea-Bissau 

 Bobó Djalo, Djibril Djaló, Kaby Djaló,  Matchoi Djaló (sons)
 Ença Fati,  Ansu Fati (cousin)
 Edelino Ié,  Edgar Ié (twin brother)
 Almami Moreira,  Diego Moreira (son)
 Romario Vieira,  Ronaldo Vieira (twin brother)

I

Ivory Coast 

 Jean-Jacques Akpa Akpro  Jean-Louis Akpa Akpro, Jean-Daniel Akpa Akpro (brothers)
 Ibrahima Bakayoko,  Ryan Bakayoko (nephew)
 Yacouba Bamba, Axel Bamba (son)
 Roger Boli,  Basile Boli (brother), Yannick Boli (nephew), Kévin Boli, Yohan Boli,  Charles Boli (sons)
 Wilfried Bony,  Geoff Bony,  Orphee Bony (sons)
 Guy Demel, Yannick Sagbo (half-brother)
 Aruna Dindane,  Aristide Bancé (brother-in-law)
 Cyril Domoraud, Gilles Domoraud, Jean-Jacques Domoraud (brothers)
 Seydou Doumbia, Ousmane Doumbia (brother)
 Michel Goba,  Kévin Goba (son), Olivier Tébily (cousin), Didier Drogba, Joël Drogba, Freddy Drogba (nephews),  Isaac Drogba (grandnephew/son of Didier),  Kenneth Zohore (Didier's cousin-nephew)
 Steve Gohouri, Joël Damahou (cousin)
 Tchiressoua Guel, Moussa Guel (son)
 Bonaventure Kalou, Salomon Kalou (brother)
 Makan Kéïta, Fadel Keïta, Kader Keïta (sons)
 Bakari Koné, Arouna Koné (brother)
 Boubacar Sanogo,  Malick Sanogo (son)
 Joël Tiéhi, Christ Tiéhi (son)
 Kolo Touré, Yaya Touré, Ibrahim Touré (brothers)

K

Kenya 

 McDonald Mariga, Thomas Wanyama (brother), Victor Wanyama (brother)
 Mike Origi, Gerald Origi (brother), Anthony Origi (brother), Austin Origi (brother), Arnold Origi (nephew/son of Austin),  Divock Origi (son)

L

Liberia 

 Joe Nagbe,  Darlington Nagbe (son)
 Alex Nimely, Sylvanus Nimely (brother)
 George Weah, Christopher Wreh (cousin),  George Weah Jr. (son),  Timothy Weah (son),  Kyle Duncan (nephew),  Patrick Weah (nephew)

M

Madagascar 

 Hervé Arsène, Faed Arsène (son)

Malawi 
 Chikondi Banda, Peter Banda (son)
 Tabitha Chawinga, Temwa Chawinga (sister)

Mali 

 Kalifa Cissé,  Salif Cissé, Ibrahima Cissé (brothers)
 Samba Diawara, Fousseni Diawara, Abdoulaye Diawara (brothers)
 Salif Keïta, Seydou Keita, Mohamed Sissoko, Sidi Yaya Keita, Oumar Sissoko (nephews)
 Mamady Sidibé,  Lassana Sidibé (brother),  Moussa Sidibé (cousin)
 Yacouba Sylla,  Moussa Sylla (brother)
 Bako Touré,  José Touré (son)
 Mustapha Yatabaré, Sambou Yatabaré (brother)

Morocco 

 Alami Ahannach,  Soufyan Ahannach (brother), Anass Ahannach (cousin)
 Nordin Amrabat, Sofyan Amrabat (brother)
 Nourdin Boukhari,  Ayoub Boukhari (brother),  Noa Lang (stepson)
 Khalid Boutaïb, Nassim Chadli (nephew)
 Mehdi Carcela,  Joachim Carcela (cousin)
 Larbi Chebbak, Ghizlane Chebbak (daughter)
 Mustapha Hadji, Youssouf Hadji (brother), Samir Hadji (Mustapha's son)
 Kassem Loune,  Adam Loune,  Ali Loune,  Mehdi Loune (sons)
Ryan Mmaee, Samy Mmaee, Camil Mmaee (brothers)
 Krimau Merry, Mustafa Merry (brother)
 Hassan Nader,  Mohcine Nader (son)
 Salaheddine Sbaï,  Amine Sbaï (brother)

Mozambique 

 Sérgio Lomba,  Pedro Neto (nephew)
 Zeca Miglietti,  Abel Miglietti (brother)
 Paíto, Edson Mucuana (son)

N

Namibia 

 Oliver Risser, Wilko Risser (brother)
 Manfred Starke,  Sandra Starke (sister)

Niger 

 Zakari Lambo, Zakari Junior Lambo (son)
 Ibrahim Tankary, Naim Van Attenhoven (nephew)

Nigeria 

 Ola Aina, Jordan Aina (brother)
 Efe Ambrose, Peter Ambrose, Emmanuel Ambrose (brothers)
 Shola Ameobi,  Tomi Ameobi, Sammy Ameobi (brothers)
 Emmanuel Amunike, Kingsley Amuneke, Kevin Amuneke (brothers)
 Tijani Babangida, Ibrahim Babangida, Haruna Babangida (brothers)
 Emmanuel Babayaro, Celestine Babayaro (brother)
 Bright Dike, Courtney Dike (sister),  Daryl Dike (brother)
 Prince Ikpe Ekong,  Emmanuel Ekong (son)
 Augustine Enuekwe,  Chioma Ubogagu (granddaughter)
 Dickson Etuhu, Kelvin Etuhu (brother)
 Dominic Iorfa,  Dominic Iorfa Jr. (son)
 Nwankwo Kanu, Christopher Kanu (brother), Henry Isaac, Anders Gabolalmo (stepbrothers), Emmanuel Izuagha (stepcousin)
 Oladipupo Martins, Obafemi Martins, John Ronan Martins (brothers)
 Segun Odegbami, Wole Odegbami (brother)
 Emmanuel Okocha, Jay-Jay Okocha (brother), Alex Iwobi (nephew)
 Osas Okoro, Stanley Okoro, Charles Okoro (brothers)
 Cyril Okosieme, Ndubuisi Okosieme (son), Nkiru Okosieme (daughter)
 Churchill Oliseh, Sunday Oliseh, Azubuike Oliseh, Egutu Oliseh (brothers),  Sekou Oliseh (adopted son of Churchill)
 Toni Payne,  Stephen Payne (brother), Nicole Payne (sister)
 Ike Shorunmu, Kayode Irekperu (brother)
 Efe Sodje, Sam Sodje, Akpo Sodje (brothers), Onome Sodje (cousin)
 Clement Temile,  Toto Tamuz (son)
 Ojokojo Torunarigha, Junior Torunarigha (son) Jordan Torunarigha (son)
 Kalu Uche, Ikechukwu Uche (brother)
 John Utaka, Peter Utaka (brother)
 Lawrence Wabara,  Mark Walters (son),  Reece Wabara (grandson),  Simon Ford (Mark's nephew)
 Simon Zenke, Thomas Zenke (brother)

R

Réunion 
 Aboubakare Baco, Soudjain Baco (brother)
 Anthony Fontaine, Julien Fontaine (brother)
 Raphael Fontaine, Willy Fontaine (brother)
 Nicolas Grondin, Samuel Grondin, Vincent Grondin (brother)
 Damien Hadamar, Jean Hadamar, Willy Hadamar (brother)
 Nathan Lim Houn Tchen, Noah Lim Houn Tchen (brother)
 Fréderic Laiton, Rodrigue Laiton (brother)
 Jordan Louiso, Landry Louiso (brother)
 Akoub Ali M’Madi, Mouhdwar Ali M’Madi (brother)
 Kenny Manglou, Kerry Manglou (brother)
 Florent Marie Marthe, Nicolas Marie Marthe (brother)
 Vincent Mounoussamy, William Mounoussamy (brother)
 Alexandre Payet, Steeve Payet (brother)
 Olivier Payet, Wilson Payet (brother)

Rwanda 
 Fritz Emeran,  Noam Emeran (son)
 Manfred Kizito,  Nestroy Kizito (brother)

S

Senegal 

 Jules Bocandé, Daniel Bocandé (son)
 Issa Cissokho,  Aly Cissokho (brother)
 Ali Dia,  Simon Dia (son)
 Mame Biram Diouf, Mame Mbar Diouf (brother)
 Khalilou Fadiga,  Noah Fadiga (son)
 Alfred Gomis, Lys Gomis,  Maurice Gomis (brothers)
Édouard Mendy,  Ferland Mendy (cousin)
 Ousmane N'Doye, Dame N'Doye (brother)
 Lamine Sané, Salif Sané (brother)
 Souleyman Sané,  Leroy Sané,  Sidi Sané (sons)
 Boubacar Sarr,  Mouhamadou-Naby Sarr (son)
 Oumar Sène,  Saër Sène (son)
 Mickaël Tavares, Jacques Faty, Ricardo Faty (cousins)
 Mame Saher Thioune, Ousseynou Thioune (brother)

Sierra Leone 

 Musa Kallon, Kemokai Kallon (brother), Mohamed Kallon (brother)
 Ibrahim Kargbo,  Ibrahim Kargbo Jr. (son)
 Leroy Rosenior,  Liam Rosenior (son)

Somalia 

 Ahmed Ali, Mohamud Ali (brother)
 Brian Fatah, Sahoh Fatah (brother)

South Africa 

 Clive Barker, Steve Barker (nephew)
 Goodenough Nkomo, Morgan Gould (son)
 Richard Henyekane, Joseph Henyekane (brother)
 Les Grobler, Bradley Grobler (son)
 Keryn Jordan, Liam Jordan (son)
 Itumeleng Khune, Lucky Khune (brother)
 Jacob Lekgetho, Goarge Lekgetho (brothers) 
 Ernest "Botsotso" Makhanya, Joseph Makhanya (son)
 Eric Masilela, Innocent Maela (son), Tsepo Masilela (half-brother)
 Bennett Masinga, Phil Masinga (cousin)
 Mark Mayambela, Mihlali Mayambela (brother)
 Patrick Mayo, Khanyisa Mayo (son)
 Thabo Mngomeni, Thando Mngomeni (brother)
 Zane Moosa, Essop Moosa (brother)
 Kaizer Motaung, Kaizer Motaung Junior (son)
 Esau Phiri, Lebogang Phiri (son)
 Siyabonga Sangweni, Thamsanqa Sangweni (brother)
 Jomo Sono, Eric Bamuza Sono (father), Bamuza Sono (son of Jomo), Matsilela Sono (brother)
 Mark Tovey, Neil Tovey (brother), Quinton Tovey (son of Mark)
 Dougie Williams, Melanie Frosler (sister), Selwyn Frosler (brother in law & husband of Melanie), Ethan Frosler (son of Selwyn & Melanie), Reeve Frosler (son of Melanie & Selwyn Frosler, brother of Ethan & nephew of Dougie Williams)

South Sudan 
 William Akio,  Victor Loturi (brother)
 Peter Deng,  Thomas Deng (brother)

T

Tanzania 

 David Mwarabu, Djafari Mwarabu (brother))

Togo 

 Samer Abraw, Camaldine Abraw (son)
 Roger Aholou,  Jean-Eudes Aholou (brother)
 Komlan Assignon,  Lorenz Assignon (son)
 Zanzan Atte-Oudeyi, Ismaila Atte-Oudeyi (brother)
 Jonathan Ayité, Floyd Ayité (brother)
 Malcolm Barcola,  Bradley Barcola (brother)
 Sadou Boukari, Razak Boukari (son)
 Pierre-Antoine Dossevi, Thomas Dossevi (son), Mathieu Dossevi (son)
 Mani Ougadja, Mani Sapol (brother)
 Rafiou Moutairou, Bachirou Salou (half-brother)
 Yao Mawuko Sènaya, Yao Junior Sènaya (brother),  Marvin Senaya (son)
 Manu Sunu, Gilles Sunu (son)

Tunisia 
 Amine Chermiti,  Youssef Chermiti (cousin)
 Iheb Msakni, Youssef Msakni (brother)
 Nabil Taïder,  Saphir Taïder (brother)

U

Uganda 

 Steven Bogere, Alex Isabirye, Frank Lukomwa (brothers)
 Paul Hasule, Geoffrey Higenyi (brother)
 Noordin Jjuuko, Muzamiru Jjuuko, Murushid Jjuuko (brothers)
 Jimmy Kidega, Moses Oloya (brother)
 Ayub Kisaliita, Habib Kavuma, Sadat Sekajja (brothers)
 Meddie Lubega, Moses Ndawula, Sula Kato, Abbas Mulindwa (brothers)
 Annet Nakimbugwe, Hasifah Nassuna (daughter)
 Denis Obua, David Obua, Eric Obua (sons),  Noble Okello (distant nephew)
 Joseph Ochaya, Fred Okot (brother)
 Emmanuel Okwi, Francis Olaki, Martin Opoloti (brothers)
 Ibrahim Sekagya, Hakim Kavuma, Sula Sebbuza (brothers)
 Sulaiman Tenywa, Mubarak Tenywa, Muhammad Segonga (brothers)

Z

Zambia 

 Kalusha Bwalya, Benjamin Bwalya (brother),  Robert Earnshaw (cousin)
 Evans Kangwa, Kings Kangwa (brother)
 Christopher Katongo, Felix Katongo (brother)
 Charly Musonda Sr. Lamisha Musonda (son),  Charly Musonda Jr. (son)
 Andrew Sinkala, Nathan Sinkala (brother)

Zimbabwe 

 Wilfred Mugeyi, William Mugeyi (twin brother)
 Knowledge Musona, Walter Musona (brother)
 Peter Ndlovu, Adam Ndlovu (brother), Madinda Ndlovu (brother)

Notes

References

Africa
association football